David R. Nelson (born May 9, 1951) is an American physicist, and Arthur K. Solomon Professor of Biophysics, at Harvard University.

Education and research

David R. Nelson is currently the Arthur K. Solomon Professor of Biophysics and Professor of Physics and Applied Physics at Harvard University. He graduated from Cornell University Summa cum laude with a double major in physics and mathematics in 1972, and received an M.S. in Theoretical Physics in 1974, and a Ph.D. in Theoretical Physics in January, 1975.  He was in the fourth and final class of Cornell's short-lived "Six-year Ph.D. program". He then became a Junior Fellow in the Harvard Society of Fellows.

Since 1978 he has been a professor at Harvard University. His research is in the fields of both hard and soft theoretical condensed matter physics, and of physical biology. His condensed matter research has focused on collective effects in the physics and chemistry of condensed matter and on spatial population genetics. He has been interested, in particular, in the interplay between fluctuations, geometry and statistical dynamics in condensed matter systems such as magnets, superfluids, liquid crystals, superconductors, polymers, turbulent fluids and metallic glasses.    Nelson also has a strong interest in biological problems such as single molecule biophysics, population dynamics in inhomogeneous media, the buckling of viral shells and the effects of selective advantages, mutations, antagonism and cooperation on the spatial population genetics of microorganisms such as bacteria and yeast on both solid and liquid substrates.

With his colleague, Bertrand Halperin, he is responsible for a theory of two-dimensional melting that predicted a fourth "hexatic" phase of matter, interposed between the usual solid and liquid phases. A variety of predictions associated with this two-state freezing process have  now been confirmed in experiments on two-dimensional colloidal assemblies, thin films and bulk smectic liquid crystals.   Nelson's research also includes a theory of the structure and statistical mechanics of metallic glasses and investigations of "tethered surfaces,” which are two-dimensional generalizations of linear polymer chains.   Flexural phonons lead a remarkable low temperature flat phase in these fishnet-like structures, with predictions of strongly scale-dependent elastic constants such as the two-dimensional Young's modulus and the bending rigidity of atomically or molecularly thin materials such as a free-standing sheets of graphene and MoS2.

Nelson has also studied flux line entanglement in the high temperature superconductors. At high magnetic fields, thermal fluctuations cause regular arrays of flux lines to melt into a tangled spaghetti state. The physics of this melted flux liquid resembles that of a directed polymer melt, and has important implications for both electrical transport and vortex pinning for many of the proposed applications of these new materials in strong magnetic fields. 
David Nelson's recent investigations have focused on problems that bridge the gap between the physical and biological sciences, including dislocation dynamics in bacterial cell walls, range expansions and genetic demixing in microorganisms and localization in asymmetric sparse neural networks.   Additional recent interests include the non-Hermitian transfer matrices that describe thermally excited vortices with columnar pins in Type II superconductors, the effect of perforations, cuts and other defects on atomically thin cantilevers at finite temperatures and topological defects on curved surfaces.

Awards
 2019 Niels Bohr Institute Medal of Honor
 2013 KITP Simons Distinguished Visiting Scholar, UCSB
2010 Kavli Lectureship, Delft University
2009 Visiting Professor, Niels Bohr Institute, Copenhagen
2007 Primakoff Lecturer, University of Pennsylvania
2007 Mark Kac Memorial Lecturer, Los Alamos National Laboratory
2006 Lorentz Visiting Professor, Leiden
2006 Sommerfeld Lecturer, Ludwig-Maximilian University, Munich
2005 Mayent-Rothschild Visiting Professor, Institute Curie, Paris
2004 Mary Upson Visiting Professor, Cornell University
2004 Oliver E. Buckley Condensed Matter Prize 
 2003 Bardeen Prize (for research in superconductivity)
2001 Welsh Lectures, University of Toronto
1995 Harvard Ledlie Prize of Harvard University
 1993-1994 Guggenheim Fellowship
 1987 Elected Fellow of the American Physical Society
 1986 Award for Initiatives in Research from the National Academy of Sciences
 1984-1989 MacArthur Prize Fellowship 
 1979-1983 AP Sloan Fellowship

Works

References

External links
 Fifth Bangalore School on Population Genetics and Evolution, International Centre for Theoretical Sciences, 2022
 Video of Introduction to Spatial Population Genetics (Lecture 1), January 19, 2022
 Video of Pushed Genetic Waves and Antagonistic Interactions (Lecture 2), January 20, 2022
 Video of Microbial Interactions and Expansions on Liquid Substrates (Lecture 3), January 21, 2022
 Video of NSCS Online Seminar:  August 11, 2020
 Video of Harvard Physics Colloquium ("On Growth and Form of Microorganisms on Liquid Substrates"):  April 20, 2020
 Video of Gene Surfing and Survival of the Luckiest:  September 25, 2019
 Video of Perforations and the Crumpling of Free-Standing Graphene:  September 17, 2018
 Video of Keynote Address, Physics@FOM Veldhoven:  January 24, 2014
 Link to Google Scholar Citations
 "DNA unzipping and motor proteins: Effect of the genetic code"  Retrieved on 5 October 2009.
"David R. Nelson", Scientific Commons

1951 births
Living people
Scientists from Stuttgart
Harvard University faculty
21st-century American physicists
MacArthur Fellows
Members of the United States National Academy of Sciences
Oliver E. Buckley Condensed Matter Prize winners
German emigrants to the United States
Fellows of the American Physical Society